A number of Kentucky Wildcats men's basketball players have been honored with various Southeastern Conference and national awards.

Banner honorees
Forty-two former Kentucky men's basketball players, coaches, and contributors are honored in Rupp Arena with banners representing their numbers hung from the rafters. With the streamlining of jersey numbers by the NCAA, the jerseys are retired but the numbers remain active. To have a banner hung, the athlete must be elected to the UK Athletics Hall of Fame.

National Players of the Year
The UK players listed here received at least one NCAA-recognized national player of the year award.

Kareem Abdul-Jabbar Award
The Kareem Abdul-Jabbar Award has been presented by the Naismith Memorial Basketball Hall of Fame since 2015 to the top Division I center.

All-Americans
The following is a list of Kentucky Wildcats men's basketball players that were named First or Second Team All-Americans:

SEC Player of the Year (AP, UPI, Coaches)

The following is a list of Kentucky Wildcats men's basketball players who have been named SEC Player of the Year:

SEC Freshmen of the Year (AP, Coaches)

The following is a list of Kentucky Wildcats men's basketball players who have been named either SEC Freshman of the Year (awarded by the league's head coaches, and open only to freshmen) or SEC Newcomer of the Year (awarded by the AP and open to any player in his first year at an SEC school, including transfers).

All listed players won both awards except for the following:
 Patrick Patterson, a freshman who won the 2008 coaches' award while Nick Calathes of Florida, also a freshman, won the AP award.
 Nerlens Noel, a freshman who won the 2013 coaches' award while junior college transfer Marshall Henderson of Ole Miss won the AP award.

Elite 90 Award

One of the NCAA's main student-athlete awards is the Elite 90 Award (previously the Elite 88 and Elite 89), presented at the site of each of the NCAA's 90 annual championship finals. In Division I men's basketball, eligible individuals are those on the playing squads of all Final Four participants who have played at least two seasons at their current school. The recipient is the eligible player with the highest grade point average, with completed credit hours as a tiebreaker if needed.

NBA Draft Picks

McDonald's All-Americans
The following is a list of Kentucky Wildcats men's basketball players who have been named McDonald's All-Americans during their prep careers:

Naismith Hall of Fame Members
The following Kentucky players, coaches, and contributors have been enshrined in the Naismith Memorial Basketball Hall of Fame.

Olympians
The following Kentucky players and coaches have represented their country in basketball in the Summer Olympic Games:

References

External links
 

 
Kentucky Wildcats basketball honorees